Behind the Lines is David Knopfler's second solo album after leaving Dire Straits. It was released in 1985 and in 1997 on the Paris Original Music label. The album was dedicated to "Anna with love".

Track listing 
All tracks composed by David Knopfler; except where indicated
"Heart to Heart" - 2:59
"Shockwave" (lyrics: David Knopfler; music: Bub Roberts, Hans Rolf Schade, David Knopfler) - 3:36
"Double Dealing" - 3:09
"The Missing Book" - 4:48
"I'll Be There" - 4:30
"Prophecies" - 5:48
"The Stone Wall Garden" - 4:11
"Sanchez" - 4:52
"One Time" - 3:16

Personnel
David Knopfler - piano, synthesizer, vocals
Bub Roberts - guitar, guitar synthesizer
Dave Taif Ball, Pino Palladino, Nick Davis - bass
Richard Dunn, Hans Rolf Schade - piano, synthesizer
Peter Schön - synthesizer, bass synthesizer on "Heart to Heart"
Arrun Ahmun - drums, percussion
Dave Jackson, Forrest Thomas, Judy Cheeks, Mick Jackson, Patricia Shockley - backing vocals
Georg Mayr - saxophone on ""I'll Be There"

References 

1985 albums
David Knopfler albums